The Billboard magazine publishes a weekly chart that ranks the bestselling albums in the United States. In 1946, twelve albums by eleven artists topped the chart. At the time, the chart was titled Best-Selling Popular Record Albums, and it collected sales data from United States-based record dealers, numbering at least 200 in January and increasing to over 4,000 by the end of the year. In 1946, all photograph records were 78 rpm records that held one recording per side. An album consisted of multiple records, each in a separate sleeve, the sleeves bound together along one edge within two stiff pasteboard covers, much like a traditional photograph album.

The first album atop the chart in 1946 was Merry Christmas, a Christmas compilation album by Bing Crosby, released by Decca. It reached the top in December 1945,
and it peaked for two more weeks in January 1946, for a total of six consecutive weeks at number one. It again reached the top in late November for an additional six weeks, making it the longest reigning album of the year. The album was certified gold 25 years after its release by the Recording Industry Association of America (RIAA) for shipments of 500,000 or more units. Crosby placed a second album atop the listing with the soundtrack to the movie The Bells of St. Mary's in March, bringing his total weeks spent at number one to ten.

Following numerous single releases in the early 1940s, Frank Sinatra released his debut studio album The Voice of Frank Sinatra in March 1946. The album topped the chart for seven consecutive weeks in April and May—the second-longest reigning album in 1946. The second longest-reigning album of the previous year, Glenn Miller,
recorded by Glenn Miller & His Orchestra, again reached the top for an additional five weeks. The album was later crowned as the bestselling album of the year and certified gold by the RIAA in 1968. The Ink Spots' eponymous album reached the top in late September and topped the chart without interruption until mid-November, making it the second-longest reigning album of the year, alongside Sinatra's.

Chart history

See also
1946 in music
List of Billboard 200 number-one albums

References

1946
United States Albums
1946 in American music